The 1989 Philippine Basketball Association (PBA) Reinforced Conference was the third and last conference of the 1989 PBA season. It started on October 1 and ended on December 12, 1989. The tournament is an import-laden format, which requires each team to have an import standing 6 feet 1 inch.

Format
The following format will be observed for the duration of the conference:
 Double-round robin eliminations; 10 games per team; Teams are then seeded by basis on win–loss records.
 Team with the worst record after the elimination round will be eliminated.
 Semifinals will be two round robin affairs with the five remaining teams. Results from the elimination round will be carried over.
 The top two teams in the semifinals advance to the best of seven finals. The last two teams dispute the third-place trophy in a best-of-five playoff.

Elimination round

Semifinals

Cumulative standings

Semifinal round standings:

Third-place playoffs

Finals

References

PBA Reinforced Conference
Reinforced Conference